Stephen Cambreleng Cowper (born August 21, 1938) is an American Democratic politician who was the sixth governor of Alaska from 1986–90. He was governor during the 1989 Exxon Valdez oil spill.

Cowper is the CEO of Steve Cowper & Associates. He has also served on the boards of multiple energy-related companies in the US and Canada.

Early life and career
Cowper was born in 1938 in Petersburg, Virginia, to Stephanie (née Smith) and Marion Cowper. He was raised in Kinston, North Carolina. He received bachelor's and law degrees from the University of North Carolina at Chapel Hill, and after serving in the U.S. Army Medical Corps and Army Reserve, he worked as a maritime lawyer in Norfolk, Virginia, for three years. Cowper moved to Fairbanks, Alaska, in 1968 and served as assistant district attorney for rural Alaska and Fairbanks.

In 1970, Cowper went to Vietnam and worked as a freelance correspondent throughout Asia. Upon returning to Alaska, he wrote a political column for the Fairbanks Daily News-Miner, taught a college course on Alaska lands, was a partner in an air taxi and cargo business, and worked as a diver for a University of Alaska marine research team.

Political career

In 1974, Cowper was elected to the Alaska House of Representatives, where he served two terms. During his time in the House, he served as chairman of the Finance Committee (1977–1978), chairman of the Steering Council on Alaska Lands (1978), a member of the Subsistence Committee (1977–1978), and a member of the Alaska Advisory Committee for the Law of the Sea Conference (1978). In 1982, Cowper ran for governor, but narrowly lost the Democratic nomination to Bill Sheffield, who went on to win the general election.

Governor of Alaska (1986–1990)
Cowper ran for governor again in 1986, and defeated incumbent Sheffield in the August 26 primary by a 2–1 margin. He eventually won the November 4 general election, winning 47% of the vote against Republican state Senator Arliss Sturgulewski and Alaskan Independence Party candidate Joe Vogler.

Once in office, Cowper proposed reestablishing the state income tax to help close the state's billion-dollar deficit; this proposal was met with strong opposition. He advocated the expansion of the University of Alaska's international study program, hoped to establish an International Trade Center, and placed emphasis on the teaching of foreign languages and culture in state schools. In early 1989, he announced that he would not seek reelection in 1990, a decision considered a surprise by some observers.

Post-governorship
After serving as governor, Cowper served as a visiting fellow at the Port Authority of New York and New Jersey in 1991, and was a Co-Chairman of the Pacific Rim Fisheries Conference in 1994 and 1997.

Since 1991, he has been the CEO of Steve Cowper & Associates, a group that advises companies and governments on energy-related initiatives. He has also served on the boards of multiple energy-related companies in the US and Canada. As of 2010, Cowper lived in Austin, Texas with his third wife and family.

References

External links
 
 Steve Cowper at 100 Years of Alaska's Legislature
 

|-

|-

1938 births
Alaska lawyers
American Episcopalians
Democratic Party governors of Alaska
Exxon Valdez oil spill
Lawyers from Fairbanks, Alaska
Living people
Democratic Party members of the Alaska House of Representatives
Military personnel from Fairbanks, Alaska
Military personnel from Virginia
Politicians from Fairbanks, Alaska
Politicians from Petersburg, Virginia
University of North Carolina School of Law alumni
Virginia lawyers